Crassispira passaloides is an extinct species of sea snail, a marine gastropod mollusk in the family Pseudomelatomidae, the turrids and allies.

Description
The length of the shell attains 11 mm.

Distribution
Fossils have been found in Eocene strata in the Paris Basin, France.

References

 Cossmann (M.), 1902 Catalogue illustré des coquilles fossiles de l'Éocène des environs de Paris (3ème appendice). Annales de la Société royale Malacologique de Belgique, t. 36, p. 9-110
 Cossmann (M.) & Pissarro (G.), 1913 Iconographie complète des coquilles fossiles de l'Éocène des environs de Paris, t. 2, p. pl. 46-65
 Le Renard (J.) & Pacaud (J.-M.), 1995 Révision des Mollusques paléogènes du Bassin de Paris. 2 - Liste des références primaires des espèces. Cossmanniana, t. 3, vol. 3, p. 65-132

External links
 MNHN: Drillia (Tripla) passaloides
 Pacaud J.M. & Le Renard J. (1995). Révision des Mollusques paléogènes du Bassin de Paris. IV- Liste systématique actualisée. Cossmanniana. 3(4): 151-187

passaloides
Gastropods described in 1902